This article contains the list of Uruguay national football team's all records and statistics.

Management record
Competitive matches only as of 14 June 2016

Player records

, after the match against Canada.
Players in bold are still active with Uruguay.

Most caps

Top scorers

All-time head-to-head record
Below is a list of all matches Uruguay have played against FIFA recognised teams. Updated as of 18 June 2021.

World Cup records
Bolded names indicate that the player is active.

Most participations in the World Cup

Most goals scored in the World Cup

Most matches played in the World Cup

World Cup winning captains

Record against teams in the World Cup
 after the match against Portugal.

Minor tournament records

†played consecutively with Taça do Atlantica in 1976

References

External links
 Uruguay FIFA profile
 RSSSF archive of results 1902–

 
National association football team records and statistics